The 2020 Miami Hurricanes football team (variously "Miami", "The U", "UM", "'Canes") represented the University of Miami during the 2020 NCAA Division I FBS football season. The Hurricanes were led by second-year head coach Manny Diaz and played their home games at Hard Rock Stadium, competing as a member of the Atlantic Coast Conference (ACC).

Previous season
In 2019, the Hurricanes began the year unranked in the AP Poll and were voted in the preseason polls 2nd to win the Coastal Division. The Hurricanes started off slow, winning 2 of their 5 games. The Hurricanes went on to win their 4 of their next 5 games but lost 3 of their final games. In the postseason, the Hurricanes were selected to play against the Louisiana Bulldogs in the 2019 Independence Bowl, which they lost 14–0.

Offseason

Position key

Offseason departures
Four Miami players with remaining eligibility declared early for the 2020 NFL Draft. In addition, 10 seniors from the 2019 team graduated.

Recruiting
 

|}

Transfers

Outgoing

2020 NFL draft

NFL Combine

Team players drafted into the NFL

Returning Starters

Season

ACC Media Days

Award Watch Lists

Preseason ALL ACC Teams

Personnel

Coaching staff

Roster

Depth chart

Projected Depth Chart 2020:

True Freshman
Double Position : *

Schedule
Miami will host four ACC conference opponents: Florida State, Pittsburgh, Virginia, and North Carolina to close out the ACC regular season. Miami will travel to five ACC conference opponents: Louisville, Clemson, NC State, Virginia Tech, and Duke. Miami is not scheduled to play ACC opponents Notre Dame, Boston College, Wake Forest, Georgia Tech, and Syracuse. The Hurricanes bye week originally came during Week 5 (On October 3). However, due to COVID-19 problems in the organization, they had bye weeks during Week 12 (on November 21) and Week 13 (on November 28).  Also due to COVID-19 problems, their game between Wake Forest and Georgia Tech were canceled.

Miami had games scheduled against Michigan State, Temple, and Wagner, which were all canceled before the start of the 2020 season due to the COVID-19 pandemic. On July 29, the ACC announced every non conference game except one would be played in the 2020 season.

The ACC released their schedule on July 29, with specific dates selected on August 6.

Game summaries

UAB

Louisville

Florida State

Clemson

Pittsburgh

Virginia

NC State

With the win, the Hurricanes became bowl eligible for the 8th straight season.

Virginia Tech

Duke

North Carolina

Oklahoma State (2020 Cheez-It Bowl)

Rankings

Players drafted into the NFL

References

Miami
Miami Hurricanes football seasons
Miami Hurricanes football